Love in Flying Colors is the fourth studio album by the Foreign Exchange, released in 2013. It peaked at number 115 on the Billboard 200 chart. Spin listed it as one of the "20 Best R&B Albums of 2013".

Track listing

Charts

References

External links
 

2013 albums
The Foreign Exchange albums